Biggar-Sask Valley is a provincial electoral district for the Legislative Assembly of Saskatchewan, Canada. It was created from parts of former Biggar, Martensville, Cut Knife-Turtleford, Batoche and Rosthern-Shellbrook ridings. It was first contested in the 2016 election.

Members of the Legislative Assembly

This riding has elected the following Members of the Legislative Assembly:

Election results

References

Saskatchewan provincial electoral districts
Biggar, Saskatchewan